Margarita Plavunova (1994 – 19 August 2019) was a Russian athlete and artists' model.

She was born in Kotovsk in 1994 and was a graduate of the sports department at Tomsk State University. She competed in the national championships and became Russian student champion in the 60m hurdles and also competing in the 100m hurdles and 400m hurdles.

Plavunova died suddenly on 19 August 2019 beside a highway in the Morshansky District of the Tambov Oblast region of western Russia at the age of 25 while jogging. Preliminary post-mortem examination suggested acute heart failure.

References

1994 births
2019 deaths
Russian female long-distance runners
Russian artists' models
Sport deaths in Russia
People from Odesa Oblast
People from Tambov Oblast